USS Egret is a name used more than once by the U.S. Navy:

 , a coastal minesweeper was placed in service 10 June 1941
 , named 19 August 1947

United States Navy ship names